"Go, Mississippi" (copyrighted as "Go, Mis-sis-sip-pi") is the regional anthem of Mississippi, adopted as the official state song on May 17, 1962.

History

Adoption 
"Go, Mississippi" was written and composed by William Houston Davis (1914–1987) and copyrighted in 1962. The copyright was assigned in 1962 to the Jackson Board of Realtors, who recommended it to the Legislature.

It was adopted as the official state song by House Concurrent Resolution 67 on May 16, 1962, during the Regular Session as General Laws of Mississippi of 1962, Chapter 654.  The Mississippi Legislature had selected it from two compositions, the other being "Mississippi, U.S.A." (© 1960), also composed by Houston Davis.  The House members met with the Senate in a joint session to listen to both compositions performed by a professional dance orchestra with the composer on drums and the Hinds Junior College Hi-Steppers dancing.  The band then swung into a chorus of "Dixie" and, according to the UPI, everyone rose.

The song was enthusiastically received in front of 41,000 fans at a formal dedication September 29, 1962, by Governor Barnett in Oxford, as performed by the Ole Miss Marching Band during a halftime of an Ole Miss–Kentucky football game.

Background 
"Go Mississippi" is the same melody as "Roll with Ross," which Houston Davis composed under a commission by Ross Barnett (1898–1987) for use as a 1959 campaign theme song for governor.  The lyrics of "Roll with Ross" include the words:

The halftime was promoted, and is chronicled, as having been an anti-integration rally, led by Barnett, the day before the Ole Miss riot over the admission of an African American, James Meredith.  The riot was not directly connected to the revised song, but its commission by the Governor — who was leading an official resistance to Federally mandated integration for Ole Miss — clouded the song's heritage.  Governor Barnett had prevailed as an enthusiastic advocate for adopting his own campaign song as the official Mississippi State Anthem.

Proposals to change

Introduction 
There have been proposals to adopt other songs for various reasons, namely because of the current song's direct connection to a staunch segregationist holdout.

1976 attempt 
In 1976, Bill Alexander (né William Brooks Alexander, Jr.; 1921–2006), State Senator from 1960 to 1983, introduced a Senate Resolution to set-up a special committee of experts to receive compositions for consideration as a new official state song, including one titled "Mississippi" by William Shirley Haynie (1918–2003).  In 1994, Charlie Pride, whose identity as a performing artist is linked closely with Mississippi culture, publicly expressed support of a group wanting to change it.

Attempts after 2000 
In 2000, State Senator William Gardner Hewes introduced Senate Bill 2960 to replace the state song with "Mississippi" by Edward Owen Miller. However, the bill died in committee. In 2003, State Senator Delma Furniss introduced Senate Bill 2217 to adopt "My Home Mississippi," by Delma Furniss, as the official state song.  The bill died in committee. In 2011, songwriters Carolyn Sue Woods of Amory and John Riggs of Nashville led a concerted campaign promoting "I Miss Mississippi" as a new state song for Mississippi. In 2015, State Senator Robert L. Jackson, introduced 2 Senate Bills:
 SB2177 to authorize two official state songs, keeping the existing song, "Go, Mississippi," and adding "My Home Mississippi"
 SB2178 to adopt "My Home Mississippi" as the official state song
Both bills died in committee February 3, 2015.

Lyrics

Sheet music
 "Go, Mississippi" (© 1962)
 In E major
 Jackson, Mississippi: Jackson Board of Realtors (publisher) (© 1962)
 

 "Go, Mississippi" (© 1961)
 (manuscript)

Selected discography 
Delta Recording Corp. recorded the original version of "Go, Mississippi" at its studio in Jackson, Mississippi, at 1653 Raymond Road.  The label, which had an office in New York City in the early 1950s at 236 West 55th Street (Midtown Manhattan), was founded by Jim Bulleit (né James Albert Bulleit; 1908–1988) and Jimmie Ammons (né James Douglas Ammons; 1919–2001). Ammons's main occupation was that of a machinist in Jackson, Mississippi. Delta was noted for its custom recording work, which included recording weddings, church choirs, and college choirs. Delta also produced recordings for the foreign language department of Ole Miss.  Moreover, Delta produced a multitude of jingles for numerous radio stations.  Delta recorded radio stations all over Mississippi for ASCAP.  When Mississippi was searching for a state song, the Delta Recording Studio reportedly recorded all the state university bands in search of the song that would truly be representative of the state.

 Original recording

 Delta Records 133 (45 rpm) (released 1962)
 Governor Ross R. Barnett Campaign Souvenir: 1959 Campaign Songs
 Jerry Lane Orchestra, Maurice Thompson Singers ₳
 Houston Davis Productions, Inc.
 
 133-657: Side 1
"Go, Mississippi" (© 1962)
 Jerry Lane Orchestra
 Houston Davis (w&m)
 
 133-656: Side 2
<li>"Roll With Ross" (© 1959)
 (audio on YouTube)
 Houston Davis (w&m)
 Maurice Thompson Singers ₳
 Orchestra conducted by Jerry Lane ‡
 
"Little Carrol's Last Stand" (© 1959) †
 (audio on YouTube)
 Houston Davis (w&m)
 Maurice Thompson Singers ₳
 Orchestra conducted by Jerry Lane

 † The copyright for "Little Carrol's Last Stand" was previously registered as "The Battle of New Orleans."  "Little Carrol's Last Stand" was a political campaign attack song commissioned in 1959 by Ross Barnett, the prevailing 1960 gubernatorial candidate against Lieutenant Governor Carroll Gartin.

 ‡ Jerry Lane was a dance band leader and trombonist from Jackson, Mississippi.  Former band members include Tom "Bone" Malone.

 ₳ The Maurice Thompson Singers were a small vocal ensemble from Jackson, Mississippi, founded and conducted by S. Maurice Thompson (1903–1973).  Thompson, a radio broadcast pioneer, had moved to Jackson in 1935 to be an announcer at WJDX.  In the 1960s, he was the station manager for WLBT.

Notes

Original copyrights
 Catalog of Copyright Entries, Third Series, Music, Library of Congress, Copyright Office

References

Mississippi Legislature citations

Further reading 
 ,

External links 
 Audio of "Roll with Ross" on YouTube

Mississippi
Music of Mississippi
Symbols of Mississippi
1962 songs
Music controversies
African-American-related controversies
Race-related controversies in the United States
Political controversies in the United States
Songs about Mississippi
Race-related controversies in music
African-American segregation in the United States